Ljubomir "Ljupko" Petrović (born 15 May 1947) is a Serbian professional football manager and former player. He also holds a Bosnian passport.

As a manager, Petrović's biggest success was winning the European Cup in the 1990–91 season with Red Star Belgrade.

Playing career
Born in Brusnica Velika (a village near Bosanski Brod) in Bosnia and Herzegovina, Yugoslavia, Petrović, Started playing for NK Darda and then moved to NK Osijek during most of his career. After his career at Osijek he also spent some time in the United States.

Managerial career
As a manager, he has been in charge of NK Osijek, FK Spartak Subotica, FK Rad, FK Vojvodina, and finally Red Star Belgrade, with whom he won the 1991 European Cup.

He has also managed Spanish side RCD Espanyol, Uruguayan C.A. Peñarol, Austrian Grazer AK (where he was dismissed after slapping Boban Dmitrović) and Chinese Shanghai Shenhua and Beijing Guoan.

He had another two spells at Red Star before moving to Bulgaria in the 2000s to coach PFC Levski Sofia and later PFC Litex Lovech. He came back to Serbia in March 2008 to become the manager of OFK Beograd, but he resigned from this position one month later.

On 2 July 2008, Petrović became the head coach of Croatian First League team Croatia Sesvete, thus becoming the first Serbian head coach of a Croatian first division team after the Yugoslav wars.

On 23 December 2008, he was appointed for the head coach of his former team FK Vojvodina from Novi Sad, title challengers in the Serbian Superliga for the 2008–09 season. Yet, after gaining only one point in the first two matches of the second part of the season, he resigned from this position on 8 March 2009. In 2010 he coached Croatian side NK Lokomotiva Zagreb a feeding club of Croatian football giant GNK Dinamo Zagreb.

In the summer of 2015 Petrović managed Litex Lovech for three matches, leading them to first place in the 2015–16 A PFG standings, but left the team in early August for family reasons. In early December he returned to the team from Lovech once again after the position of manager was vacated by Laurențiu Reghecampf. Petrović guided them to the 1/2 finals of the Bulgarian Cup. However, it eventually turned out to be another short-lived appointment for the Serbian head coach, as Litex were expelled from the A PFG by the Bulgarian Football Union after their players were ordered off the pitch in a heated derby match against Levski Sofia held on 12 December.

In May 2016, he was unveiled as the new manager of Levski Sofia, replacing Stoycho Stoev. He left Levski on 22 October 2016.

After Levski he also managed Vietnemese club Thanh Hoa FC and Rwandan club APR FC.

In December 2018, Petrović became a consultant at PFC CSKA Sofia.

Since 21 July 2019 he is officially the head coach of PFC CSKA Sofia, replacing Dobromir Mitov who was demoted to assistant.

In 2020, he returned to Vietnam to manage FLC Thanh Hóa, currently Đông Á Thanh Hóa once again for the 2021 V.League 1 season.

FK Sarajevo controversy
On 8 April 2014, Petrović was announced as the successor of the recently sacked Croatian manager Robert Jarni as the head of the FK Sarajevo team.

However, only two days after, a picture of the manager and deceased Serbian paramilitary commander Arkan erupted in the Bosnian media depicting Petrović holding a weapon while instructed by the war criminal. This resulted in a hurried press conference where the FK Sarajevo board of members announced that no contract would be signed with Petrović.

The manager himself agreed to the decision, citing the possibility of strained working conditions after the unexpected publication. He however claimed no involvement in the Yugoslav wars nor the paramilitary activities of Arkan. Petrović managed FK Sarajevo for only one day, conducting a single training with the players. The authenticity of the photo has later been brought to doubt.

Personal life
Petrović is married to Snežana with whom he has two children: son Srđan and daughter Svetlana. He also has three grandchildren: Nikola, Anastasija and Viktor.

Honours

Player
Osijek
Yugoslav Second League: 1969–70 (West), 1972–73 (West), 1976–77 (West)

Manager
Spartak Subotica 
Yugoslav Second League: 1987–88 (West)

Vojvodina 
Yugoslav First League: 1988–89

Red Star Belgrade 
Yugoslav First League: 1990–91
Serbia and Montenegro First League 1994–95
Serbia and Montenegro Cup: 1994–95
European Cup: 1990–91

Levski Sofia
Bulgarian Championship: 2000–01

Beijing Guoan 
Chinese FA Cup: 2003

Litex Lovech 
Bulgarian Cup: 2003–04

APR FC
Rwanda National Football League: 2013–14, 2017–18

References

External links

MISL career stats
Ljupko Petrović at Footballdatabase

1947 births
Living people
People from Brod, Bosnia and Herzegovina
Serbs of Bosnia and Herzegovina
Association football forwards
Yugoslav footballers
NK Osijek players
Buffalo Stallions players
Kansas City Comets (original MISL) players
Phoenix Inferno players
Yugoslav Second League players
Yugoslav First League players
Major Indoor Soccer League (1978–1992) players
Yugoslav expatriate footballers
Expatriate soccer players in the United States
Yugoslav expatriate sportspeople in the United States
Yugoslav football managers
Serbian football managers
Serbian expatriate football managers
Bosnia and Herzegovina football managers
NK Osijek managers
FK Spartak Subotica managers
FK Vojvodina managers
FK Rad managers
Red Star Belgrade managers
RCD Espanyol managers
Peñarol managers
PAOK FC managers
Olympiacos F.C. managers
Grazer AK managers
Al Ahli Club (Dubai) managers
Shanghai Shenhua F.C. managers
PFC Levski Sofia managers
Beijing Guoan F.C. managers
PFC Litex Lovech managers
OFK Beograd managers
NK Croatia Sesvete managers
NK Lokomotiva Zagreb managers
FC Taraz managers
FC Akzhayik managers
APR F.C. managers
PFC CSKA Sofia managers
Yugoslav First League managers
La Liga managers
Super League Greece managers
Chinese Super League managers
UEFA Champions League winning managers
Yugoslav expatriate football managers
Expatriate football managers in Spain
Yugoslav expatriate sportspeople in Spain
Expatriate football managers in Uruguay
Serbia and Montenegro expatriate football managers
Expatriate football managers in Greece
Serbia and Montenegro expatriate sportspeople in Greece
Expatriate football managers in Austria
Serbia and Montenegro expatriate sportspeople in Austria
Expatriate football managers in the United Arab Emirates
Serbia and Montenegro expatriate sportspeople in the United Arab Emirates
Expatriate football managers in China
Serbia and Montenegro expatriate sportspeople in China
Expatriate football managers in Bulgaria
Serbia and Montenegro expatriate sportspeople in Bulgaria
Expatriate football managers in Croatia
Serbian expatriate sportspeople in Croatia
Expatriate football managers in Kazakhstan
Serbian expatriate sportspeople in Kazakhstan
Serbian expatriate sportspeople in Bulgaria
Expatriate football managers in Rwanda
Expatriate football managers in Vietnam
Serbian expatriate sportspeople in Vietnam